Edward Heath (1916–2005) served as Prime Minister of the United Kingdom from 1970 to 1974.

Edward or Ted Heath may also refer to:
Edward Bayard Heath (1888–1931), American aircraft engineer
Edward Heath (New Orleans) (1819–1892), mayor of New Orleans from 1867 to 1868
Ted Heath (bandleader) (1902–1969), British musician and big band leader
Eddie Heath, British football scout accused of child abuse